A cappuccino (Italian plural: cappuccini) is an espresso-based coffee drink that originated in Italy and is traditionally prepared with steamed milk foam (microfoam).

Variations of the drink involve the use of cream instead of milk, using non-dairy milk substitutes and flavoring with cinnamon or chocolate powder. It is typically smaller in volume than a caffè latte, with a thicker layer of microfoam.

The name comes from the Capuchin friars, referring to the colour of their habits, and in this context referring to the colour of the beverage when milk is added in small portion to dark, brewed coffee (today mostly espresso). The physical appearance of a modern cappuccino with espresso créma and steamed milk is a result of a long evolution of the drink.

According to a popular but unverified legend, cappuccino was invented by the Italian capuchin monk Marco d'Aviano after the Battle of Vienna.

The Viennese bestowed the name "Kapuziner", possibly in the 18th century, on an early version that included whipped cream and spices of unknown origin. The Italian cappuccino was unknown outside Italy until the 1930s. It is sometimes said to have been born in the coffee houses of Trieste and other Italian areas of the Austro-Hungarian Empire in the early 20th century, spreading throughout Italy after World War I and later worldwide. However, the existence in Central Italy of a coffee drink mixed with milk with the name cappuccino is already documented in the 19th century.

Definition 

Outside of Italy, cappuccino is a coffee drink that today is typically composed of a single espresso shot and hot milk, with the surface topped with foamed milk. Cappuccinos are most often prepared with an espresso machine. The espresso is poured into the bottom of the cup, followed by a similar amount of hot milk, which is prepared by heating and texturing the milk using the espresso machine steam wand. The top third of the drink consists of milk foam; this foam can be decorated with artistic drawings made with the same milk, called latte art.

Commercial coffee restaurant chains in the US more often serve the cappuccino as a  drink or larger. Outside of Italy, the ratios of espresso, milk, and foam typically equal 1/3 each.

Cappuccino is traditionally small (180 ml maximum) with a thick layer of foam, while "latte" traditionally is larger (200–300 ml). Caffè latte is often served in a large glass; cappuccino mostly in a 150–180 ml cup with a handle. Cappuccino traditionally has a layer of textured milk microfoam exceeding 1 cm in thickness; microfoam is frothed/steamed milk in which the bubbles are so small and so numerous that they are not seen, but it makes the milk lighter and thicker. As a result, the microfoam will remain partly on top of the mug when the espresso is poured in correctly as well as mix well with the rest of the cappuccino.

The World Barista Championships have been arranged annually since 2000, and during the course of the competition, the competing barista must produce—for four sensory judges—among other drinks four cappuccinos, defined in WBC Rules and Regulations as "[...] a coffee and milk beverage that should produce a harmonious balance of rich, sweet milk and espresso [...] The cappuccino is prepared with one (1) single shot of espresso, textured milk and foam. ("Textured milk" is milk that has been aerated to its proper foam level.) A minimum of 1 centimeter of foam depth [...] A cappuccino is a beverage between 150 ml and 180 ml in total volume [...]."

Etymology 

'Cappuccino' comes from Latin Caputium, later borrowed in German/Austrian and modified into Kapuziner. It is the diminutive form of cappuccio in Italian, meaning "hood" or something that covers the head, thus cappuccino literally means "small capuchin".

The coffee beverage has its name not from the hood but from the colour of the hooded robes worn by monks and nuns of the Capuchin order. This colour is quite distinctive, and capuchin was a common description of the colour of red-brown in 17th century Europe. The Capuchin monks chose the particular design of their orders' robes both in colour and shape of the hood back in the 16th century, inspired by Francis of Assisi's preserved 13th century vestments. The long and pointed hood was characteristic and soon gave the brothers the nickname "capuchins" (hood-wearing). It was, however, the choice of red-brown as the order's vestment colour that, as early as the 17th century, saw "capuchin" used also as a term for a specific colour. While Francis of Assisi used uncoloured and un-bleached wool for his robes, the Capuchins coloured their vestments to differ from Augustinians, Benedictines, Franciscans, and other orders.

The word cappuccino, in its Italian form, appears in Italian writings in the 19th century and is described as "black coffee with a few drops of milk or cream which give it the color the tunic of the Capuchins, from which it takes it name". The German language Kapuziner is mentioned as a coffee beverage in the 18th century in Austria, and is described as, "coffee with sugar, egg yolks and cream", in dictionary entries from 1800 onwards.

The use of fresh milk in coffee in cafés and restaurants is a newer phenomenon (from the 20th century), introduced when refrigeration became common. The use of full cream is known much further back in time (but not in the use as whipped cream [chantilly]), as this was a product more easily stored and frequently used also in cooking and baking. Thus, a kapuziner was prepared with a very small amount of cream to get the capuchin colour. Today, kapuziner is still served in Viennese traditional cafés, comprising still black coffee with only a few drops of cream (in some establishments developed into a dollop of whipped cream).

History and evolution 

The consumption of coffee in Europe was initially based on the traditional Ottoman preparation of the drink, by bringing to boil the mixture of coffee and water together, sometimes adding sugar. The British seem to have started filtering and steeping coffee already in the second part of the 18th century, and France and continental Europe followed suit. By the 19th century, coffee was brewed in different devices designed for both home and public cafés.

Adding milk to coffee was mentioned by Europeans already in the 1700s, and sometimes advised.

Kapuziner showed up on coffee house menus all over the Habsburg monarchy around the late 1700's, and is in 1805 described in a Wörterbuch (dictionary) as "coffee with cream and sugar" (although it does not say how it is composed). Kapuziner is mentioned again in writings in the 1850s, described as "coffee with cream, spices and sugar". Around the same time, the coffee beverage melange is mentioned in writings, explained as a blend of coffee and milk, presumably similar to the modern day caffè latte or Wiener Melange. Other coffees containing cream surfaced in Vienna, and outside Austria these are referred to as "Viennese coffee" or "café Viennois", coffee with whipped cream. Predecessors of Irish coffee, sweetened coffee with different alcohols, topped with whipped cream also spread out from Vienna.

Kapuziner took its name from the colour of coffee with a few drops of cream, so nicknamed because the Capuchin monks in Vienna and elsewhere wore vestments with this colour. Another popular coffee was Franziskaner, with more cream, referring to the somewhat lighter brown colour of the robes of monks of the Franciscan order. Kapuziner coffee spread throughout Central Europe and thus also in the Italian-speaking parts of the Habsburg monarchy. The main port of the empire, the city of Trieste, already had many Viennese coffee houses back then.

"Cappuccino" as written today (in Italian) is first mentioned in the 19th century and is described as "black coffee with a few drops of milk or cream". The modern Italian cappuccino evolved and developed in the following decades: the steamed milk atop is a later addition, and in the US a slight misunderstanding has led to the naming of this "cap" of milk foam "monk's head", although it originally had nothing to do with the name of the beverage.

Although coffee was brewed differently all over Europe after the Second World War, in Italy, espresso machines became widespread only during the 1950s, and "cappuccino" was redefined, now made from espresso and frothed milk (although far from the quality of "microfoam" steamed milk today). As the espresso machines improved, so did the dosing of coffee and the heating of the milk. Outside Italy, cappuccino spread but was generally made from dark coffee with whipped cream, as it still is in large parts of Europe even in 2014.

Kapuziner remained unchanged on the Austrian coffee menu and in Bratislava, Budapest, Prague, and other cities of the former empire.

Espresso machines were introduced at the beginning of the 20th century, after Luigi Bezzera of Milan filed the first patent in 1901, although the first generations of machines certainly did not make espresso the way we define it today.

Coffee making in cafés changed in the first decades of the 20th century. These first machines made it possible to serve coffee espresso specifically to each customer. The cups were still the same size, and the dose of beans was ground coarse as before. The too high temperature of the boilers scalded the coffee, and several attempts at improving this came in the years after the First World War.

After the Second World War, the Italians launched the "age of crema", as the new coffee machines could create a higher pressure, leading to a finer grind and the now classic crema.

The first small cups appeared in the 1950s, and the machines could by then also heat milk, thus, the modern cappuccino was born. In Vienna, espresso bars were introduced in the 1950s, leading to both the kapuziner and the new-born Italian cappuccino's being served as two different beverages alongside each other.

In the United Kingdom, espresso coffee initially gained popularity in the form of the cappuccino, influenced by the British custom of drinking coffee with milk, the desire for a longer drink to preserve the café as a destination, and the exotic texture of the beverage.

In the United States, cappuccino spread alongside espresso in Italian American neighborhoods, such as Boston's North End, New York's Little Italy, and San Francisco's North Beach. New York City's Caffe Reggio (founded 1927) claims to have introduced cappuccino to the United States, while San Francisco's Caffe Trieste (founded 1956) claims to have introduced it to the west coast; the earlier Tosca Cafe in San Francisco (founded 1919) served a "cappuccino" earlier, but this was without coffee, and instead consisted of chocolate, steamed milk, and brandy.

Ingredients 

As cappuccino is defined today, in addition to a single shot of espresso, the most important factors in preparing a cappuccino are the texture and temperature of the milk. When a barista steams the milk for a cappuccino, microfoam is created by introducing very tiny bubbles of air into the milk, giving the milk a velvety texture. Variations could be made adding another shot of espresso resulting in a double cappuccino. Attaining the correct ratio of foam requires close attention while steaming the milk, thus making the cappuccino one of the most difficult espresso-based beverages to make properly. A skilled barista may obtain artistic shapes (latte art) while pouring the milk on the top of the espresso coffee.

Popularity 
Cappuccino was traditionally a taste largely appreciated in Europe, Australia, South America, and some of North America. By the mid-1990s, cappuccino was made more available to North Americans, as upscale coffee houses sprang up.

In Italy and throughout continental Europe, cappuccino is traditionally consumed in the morning, usually as part of breakfast, often with some kind of pastry. Italians generally do not drink cappuccino with meals other than breakfast, although they often drink espresso after lunch or dinner. In Italy, cappuccino is usually consumed up to 11:00 a.m., since cappuccinos are milk-based and considered too heavy to drink later in the day. Instead, espresso is usually ordered after a meal due to the belief that the lack of milk aids in digestion. In North America, cappuccinos have become popular concurrent with the boom in the American coffee industry through the late 1990s and early 2000s, especially in the urban Pacific Northwest.

Cappuccino is traditionally served in  cups.

Preparation

Traditional and latte art 

Although size is what varies most among different cappuccinos, there are two main ways of preparing cappuccino: one is the traditional or classical way with a cap of milk foam; the other is the "latte art" way. The former follows the traditional idea of the cappuccino being prepared by  espresso,  steamed milk and  milk foam. The latter follows the same recipe, but is served more often in smaller cups, and the textured milk is gently poured in and finished with a pattern in the surface crèma. The illustrations in this article show the preparation methods.

Cappuccino Freddo 
Cappuccino Freddo is the cold version of a cappuccino, and the drink usually has a small amount of cold frothed milk atop it. The drink is available in Greece, Cyprus and parts of Italy.

In Rome, coffee bars have the drink already prepared and chilled. In cities of Northern Italy like Milan, the Cappuccino Freddo is less common. Instead, gelato da bere (a thick blend of gelato and espresso) or shakerato (espresso and ice shaken together) are more popular. The term has also spread throughout the Mediterranean region where foam is added to the drink just before serving, often varying from the Italian original. A caffè freddo or freddo espresso is a cold version of an espresso (without milk).

In North America, the terms "Cappuccino Freddo" or "Iced cappuccino", if offered, may be somewhat of a misnomer if the characteristic frothed milk is omitted in the iced variation. For example, at Starbucks, without the frothed milk the drink is called an "iced latte".

Freddo Cappuccino
In Greece and Cyprus, a cold cappuccino is widespread known as Freddo Cappuccino, as opposed to Cappuccino Freddo. Despite its Italian name, the drink both tastes and is prepared differently from its Italian counterpart, and is uncommon in Italy and outside of Greece. The Freddo Cappuccino is topped with a cold milk-based foam known as afrógala, which is created by blending cold milk using an electric frother. These frothers are commonplace in Greek coffee shops due to their usage during the preparation of frappé coffee. The foam is then added to espresso poured over ice.

Along with the Freddo Espresso, they were conceived in Greece in 1991 and are in higher demand during summer. Outside Greece and Cyprus, Freddo Cappucino or Cappuccino Freddo is mostly found in coffee shops and delis catering to the Greek expat community. In 2017, Starbucks added the Cappuccino Freddo to branch menus in Europe.

Iced cappuccino 

In Canada, the Tim Hortons coffee chain sells iced coffee cappuccino under the brand name Iced Capps. The coffee drink mix comes to the stores as a thick black syrup which is mixed at three parts water to one part syrup in a Slurpee machine. The frozen coffee drink is then blended with cream at the time of service (or blended with milk, or chocolate milk upon customer request). The Ice Capp can also be prepared as a Supreme, which includes a flavour shot, whipped topping, and either caramel or chocolate syrup. The chain also carries iced coffee on both its Canadian and U.S. menus.

Similar drinks 
Other milk and espresso drinks similar to the cappuccino include:
 Caffè macchiato (sometimes called espresso macchiato) is a significantly shorter drink, which consists of espresso with only a small amount of milk.
 Cortado is a Spanish hybrid: a slightly shorter drink, which consists of espresso mixed with milk in a 1:1 to 1:2 ratio, and is not topped with foam. Cafè Cortado has traditionally been served in a small glass on a saucer, and its character comes from the Spanish preference of coffee beans and roast plus condensed milk replacing fresh dairy milk. Modern coffee shops have started using fresh milk.
 Flat white is a hybrid which is popular in Australia and New Zealand. It is in between a cappuccino and a caffè latte ('flat' indicating little or no foam), typically prepared with a double shot of espresso and a little latte art atop. A flat white is prepared with a milder espresso and no robusta.
 Latte (short for "caffè latte") is a larger drink, with the same amount of espresso, but with more milk and a varying amount of foam, served in a large cup or tall glass.
 Steamer or babyccino is a drink of frothed milk without coffee (hence no caffeine). In the United States it often has flavoured syrup added, while in Commonwealth countries it instead often has a dusting of cocoa powder.

See also 

 List of coffee drinks

References

External links

 Free newsletter featuring articles on the quality of espresso, chemical and sensory analysis, and market trends.

Coffee drinks
Italian cuisine
Italian drinks
Order of Friars Minor Capuchin